The Macedonian Monument is on the campus of the United States Naval Academy, across the street from Mahan Hall, at the end of Stribling Walk.  The monument's sculpture is the figurehead of HMS Macedonian, captured by Stephen Decatur and the American frigate  in the opening days of the War of 1812. Also known as Alexander the Great and the Figurehead of Hans Macedonian, the wooden sculpture dates to circa 1810. It came to the Academy in 1875.

Description

The sculpture is wood, treated with epoxy resin, surmounting a stone base. The carver is unknown. Beneath the figurehead is a bronze relief of the engagement between the frigates United States and Macedonian by Edward Berge, created in 1924. The four cannons are 18-pounder long guns captured with HMS Macedonian.

Inscriptions

Berge's relief of the battle has eroded with time. It is a graphic very similar to Thomas Birch's Engagement between the "United States" and the "Macedonian", painted in 1813.

On the front of the base, facing Mahan Hall:

Directly below is a small plaque:

On the back of the base, facing Bancroft Hall:

History

The battle between the two frigates was an American victory.  Macedonian, over-matched by every measure, was captured after a short fight. She became USS Macedonian, and served in the United States Navy until late 1828.  Arriving in Virginia 30 October 1828, she was decommissioned and broken up at Gosport Navy Yard, Portsmouth, Va. Her keel became that of the US Navy's second , a 36‑gun frigate started in 1832. Some time afterwards, the old Macedonian's figurehead became a monument at the shipyard. It was transferred to the Academy in 1875.

The monument was refreshened in 2014.  The figurehead was replaced with a newly carved mahogany version, the benches were replaced, the concrete base was repaired, and the cannons and plaques were refurbished. The project cost $300,000, provided as a gift by the Academy class of 1973. The rededication ceremony was 25 April 2014.

References

External links

Monuments and memorials in Maryland
1875 sculptures
United States Naval Academy buildings and structures